Shrugged is a comic series published by Aspen MLT, publishers of Soulfire and Fathom. It was written by Aspen founder Michael Turner. It was also contributed by then vice president Frank Mastromauro and drawn by Aspen artist Micah Gunnell.

Story
The story follows a teenager named Theo, who possesses two entities in his life, Ange and Dev, who try to influence him at every decision. They both come from an alternate dimension called Perspecta, where a citizen from each "side" is assigned to a human being in our dimension. Angelia is Theo's representative from Elysia and Devonshire is the representative from Nefario, their character designs fitting the typical stereotypes of an "Angel" and a "Devil".

Having begun in May 2006, Shrugged faced ongoing delays due to co-creator Michael Turner's struggle with cancer. Turner died in mid-2008, with Shrugged completing its eight-issue run in January 2009. It was collected in trade paperback in late February-early March 2009.

External links
 Aspen Comics homepage

Aspen Comics titles
2006 comics debuts